Ereğli Coal Mine, in Zonguldak Province in Turkey, was created before TKİ and was one of the first coal mines of TKİ, the Turkish state mining company.

References

External links 

 coal mines in Turkey on Global Energy Monitor

Coal mines in Turkey
Zonguldak Province
Ereğli (Zonguldak)